Drosera heterophylla, the swamp rainbow, is an erect perennial tuberous species in the carnivorous plant genus Drosera that is endemic to Western Australia. It grows in shallow water swamps or wet clay flats near granite outcrops and occurs in the vicinity of Perth and to its north. It is the only species in the genus that produces many-petaled flowers (as opposed to the usual four- or five-petaled flower). These white flowers emerge from June to September.

D. heterophylla was first described and named by John Lindley in his 1839 manuscript, A sketch of the vegetation of the Swan River Colony.

See also
List of Drosera species

References

Carnivorous plants of Australia
Caryophyllales of Australia
Eudicots of Western Australia
Plants described in 1839
heterophylla